The Church of la Asunción (Spanish: Iglesia Parroquial de la Asunción) is a church located in Galapagar, Spain. It was declared Bien de Interés Cultural in 1995.

References 

Asuncion, Galapagar
Bien de Interés Cultural landmarks in the Community of Madrid